Paradactylodon, the mountain salamanders or Middle Eastern stream salamanders, is a genus of salamanders in the family Hynobiidae found in Afghanistan. 

The following species are recognised in the genus Paradactylodon:
Paradactylodon persicus
Paradactylodon mustersi

References

Caudata Culture 2009. Hynobiidae. Downloaded on 15 November 2009.

 
Fauna of Afghanistan